In adventure games, a text parser takes typed input (a command) from the player and simplifies it to something the game can understand. Usually, words with the same meaning are turned into the same word (e.g. "take" and "get") and certain filler words are dropped (e.g. articles, or the "at" in "look at rock").

The parser makes it easier for the game's author to react on input. The author does not have to write special code to process the commands "get the gem", "take the gem", "get gem", "take gem", "take the precious gem", etc. separately, as the parser will have stripped the input down to something like "take gem".

For the player, the game is more flexible, as the game has a larger vocabulary, and there are fewer guess-the-verb and guess-the-noun problems.

Parsers are used in early interactive fiction games like the Zork series, and more recently in games created by systems like Inform and TADS.

See also
 Natural language parsing

External links 
 Inform Designers Manual (in particular, see chapter 4, "Describing and Parsing", and chapter 5, "Natural Language")
 How To Program A Simple Text Parser Basic Tutorials .
 Text Tools Collection Demos.

Parsing
Text parser